is a retired Grand Prix motorcycle road racer from Japan. He was Japanese Champion in the 1993 F1 All-Japan Road Racing Championship on Kawasaki, 2001 in S-NK All-Japan Road Racing Championship on Suzuki and 2003 JSB1000 All-Japan Road Racing Championship on Suzuki. He won the  Superbike World Championship round at Sugo as a wild card rider for Suzuki. Kitagawa coming 16th in the season's overall standings. Kitagawa finished 2nd in the Suzuka 8 Hours race, teamed with Akira Ryo. He was also a three-time winner of the Bol d'or endurance race. He retired from racing at the end of 2006, after winning the 2005 and 2006 Endurance World Championship.

References

External links
Worldsbk.com profile
MotoGP.com profile

1967 births
Living people
Sportspeople from Kyoto
Japanese motorcycle racers
Superbike World Championship riders
500cc World Championship riders